The Northern Ireland Football League Cup (known as the BetMcLean Cup for sponsorship purposes, and commonly known as the Irish League Cup) is a national football knock-out cup competition in Northern Ireland open to all member clubs of the Northern Ireland Football League. It is the third-most prestigious competition in domestic Northern Irish football after the NIFL Premiership and Irish Cup. It should not be confused with the Irish League Floodlit Cup which ran from 1987–88 to 1997–98. Unlike the Irish Cup, the League Cup does not have a berth for UEFA Europa Conference League qualification. The cup has been operated by the Northern Ireland Football League since the 2013–14 season when it took over the administration from the Irish Football Association (IFA), after which the cup was renamed to the Northern Ireland Football League (NIFL) Cup.

Since the 2017–18 season, the Cup has been sponsored by McLean Bookmakers. The competition's previous sponsors are JBE (2015–16), WASP Solutions (2013–14 and 2014–15), Irn Bru (2011–12 and 2012–13), Co-operative Insurance (2001–02 to 2010–11), Coca-Cola (1998–99 to 2000–01), Wilkinson Sword (1991–92 to 1997–98), and Roadferry Freight (1986–87 to 1990–91).

Linfield are the current holders, after they defeated Coleraine 2–0 in the 2023 final to win the competition for a record-extending 11th time overall, and the first time since 2019. Coleraine finished as runners-up for the second consecutive season after their seventh defeat in a League Cup final overall, setting a new record in the competition for the most defeats in a final.

Format
Unlike the Irish Cup, the League Cup is restricted to the 36 Northern Ireland Football League clubs competing in the NIFL Premiership, NIFL Championship, and NIFL Premier Intermediate League. All rounds of the competition use a knock-out system consisting of one-legged ties. In the event that the scores are level after 90 minutes, extra time is played, and if the teams are still level after 120 minutes there is a penalty shoot-out.

The eight lowest-ranked clubs from the previous season's NIFL Premier Intermediate League (the clubs that finished 5th–11th as well as the newly-promoted club, or the clubs that finished 5th–12th if there was no promotion/relegation) take part in the preliminary round, with the 4 winners joining the remaining 28 NIFL clubs in the first round. The 16 highest-ranked clubs from the previous season's league system are then seeded in the first round to avoid drawing each other. The first round is the only round of the competition in which seeding is used. From there on the competition uses an open draw with a standard knock-out format, consisting of the second round, quarter-finals, semi-finals and the final.

History
The competition began with 32 clubs in a straight knock-out format in February 1987, and included teams from the Irish League B Division until 1997–98. From 1998–99 until 2007–08, only senior (Irish League and Irish Premier League) teams competed, but the competition was opened up to the 17 Championship clubs in 2008–09, and again in 2010–11 to include clubs from Championship 2, after the Championship 2 League Cup was abolished. From 2001–02 until 2007–08, a group stage followed by a knock-out system was used instead of the straight knock-out system, and for two seasons (2008–09 and 2009–10) two-legged home and away aggregate ties were used up until the quarter-finals, instead of single matches.

When it was first introduced in the 1986–87 season, it was one of a number of senior cup competitions run by the Irish League, originally to compensate for the relatively few league fixtures (traditionally 22 or 26), but also as vehicles for sponsorship revenue. The League Cup would have been considered less prestigious than the long-standing Gold Cup and Ulster Cup. Over time however, these other cup competitions were phased out as the number of Irish League fixtures increased and the public appetite for additional competitions reduced, leaving the League Cup as the only cup competition run by the Northern Ireland Football League and now established as the third most prestigious competition in Northern Ireland after the national top-flight and national cup. The actual trophy presented to the winners is the old City Cup, which was another senior Irish League competition that was discontinued in 1975.

The first final took place on 9 May 1987 at Glentoran's ground, the Oval, and was contested by Linfield and Crusaders. Linfield became the inaugural winners of the cup, defeating Crusaders 2–1. Since then, Linfield have been the most successful club in the competition, winning the Cup a record 11 times overall in a record 14 final appearances - their three final defeats all coming against Big Two rivals Glentoran. The most common final has indeed been the Big Two derby, which has occurred seven times - the last of which came in 2005–06. The 1988–89 final, played between the two sides at the Oval on 11 November 1988 was won courtesy of a goal by Glentoran goalkeeper Alan Patterson, via a kick from his own penalty area. This was the first time that a goalkeeper had ever scored in a British football final.

Cliftonville hold the record for the most consecutive wins, having won four successive finals between 2013 and 2016. Fifteen different clubs have reached the final, but only twelve clubs have gone on to win the cup - and only six of those have won the cup more than once. Carrick Rangers (once), along with Larne and Newry City (twice each) are the only three clubs to have played in the final but never won the Cup. Conversely, three clubs have a 100% record in the final, lifting the cup in their sole final appearance to date: Bangor in 1992–93, Lisburn Distillery in 2010–11, and Dungannon Swifts in 2017–18. In 2008–09, Championship side Portadown became the first intermediate club and the first club from outside the top flight to reach the final, and subsequently to win the cup, after defeating Premiership side Newry City 1–0. That was also the first final to be played outside Belfast, with Mourneview Park, Lurgan hosting the match. It was attended by UEFA President Michel Platini and Northern Ireland manager Nigel Worthington who was in Northern Ireland for the FIFA meeting held in Newcastle.

The biggest winning margin ever recorded in a final is 4–0, which has occurred twice: in 1999–2000 when Linfield defeated Coleraine, and in 2012–13 when Cliftonville defeated Crusaders. On four occasions, the same two clubs have met in consecutive finals. Linfield and Glentoran have done so three times: 1997–98 & 1998–99, 2001–02 & 2002–03 and 2004–05 & 2005–06, while Cliftonville and Crusaders repeated the feat in 2012–13 and 2013–14. Both clubs agreed to toss a coin for home advantage in the 2013–14 final, with Cliftonville winning the toss. As a result, Solitude was chosen as the final venue for the first time in the competition's history.

In the 2015–16 competition, Cliftonville became the first club ever to reach four consecutive League Cup finals, and subsequently to win four consecutive Cups, after they defeated Ards 3–0 in the final. Ards were appearing in the final for the third time overall, and became only the second club from outside the top flight ever to reach the League Cup final, emulating Portadown in 2008–09. Ards' previous final appearance had also been against Cliftonville, when they won the Cup 2–0 on penalties after a 0–0 draw in 1994–95. Ards also set a record for the longest gap between final appearances of 21 years between 1994–95 and 2015–16. This broke the previous record of 19 years between Newry City's appearances in 1989–90 and 2008–09.

Following a one-year hiatus in which the cup was not played during the 2020–21 season as a result of the COVID-19 pandemic in Northern Ireland, the competition returned for the 2021–22 season, which saw the final being played on a Sunday for the first time in the competition's history. This attracted a League Cup final record crowd of 11,103 at Windsor Park, where Cliftonville won the cup for the sixth time after a 4–3 win over defending champions Coleraine in extra time. This also became the highest scoring final in the cup's history.

Media coverage
The final was initially broadcast as highlights on UTV throughout the 1990s and early 2000s. Live coverage of the final first began on the BBC in 2005, and continued until Sky acquired the rights to show the 2013 and 2014 finals on Sky Sports as part of a deal to cover Northern Ireland international matches. Following the 2014 final, it returned to the BBC in 2015 after Sky ceased their coverage of Irish League football. Dungannon Swifts' win in the 2018 final was broadcast live on Sky Sports enabling the entire town of Dungannon to enjoy the historical result, Dungannon winning a major trophy for the first time in their history
.

Records
Most final wins: 11, Linfield
Most consecutive final wins: 4, Cliftonville (2012–13, 2013–14, 2014–15 & 2015–16)
Most final appearances: 14, Linfield
Most consecutive final appearances: 4, Cliftonville (2012–13, 2013–14, 2014–15 & 2015–16)
Most final defeats: 7, Coleraine (1992–93, 1993–94, 1999–00, 2009–10, 2011–12, 2021–22 & 2022–23)
Most consecutive final defeats: 3, Glentoran (1996–97, 1997–98 & 1998–99)
Highest scoring final: 7 goals, Cliftonville 4–3  Coleraine (2021–22)
Biggest final winning margin: 4–0, joint record:
Linfield 4–0 Coleraine (1999–2000)
Cliftonville 4–0 Crusaders (2012–13)
Longest gap between final wins: , Coleraine (1987–88 & 2019–20)
Longest gap between final appearances: , Ards (1994–95 & 2015–16)
Most final appearances without winning: 2, joint record:
Larne (1991–92 & 2003–04)
Newry City (1989–90 & 2008–09)
Most common final: Glentoran v Linfield, 7 times (1988–89, 1997–98, 1998–99, 2001–02, 2002–03, 2004–05 & 2005–06)
Record win: Ards 12–0 UUJ (first round, 1989–90)

Final results

Performance by club

Final venues
There have been 36 League Cup finals contested during the competition's history so far, played at six different grounds. Windsor Park has been the most common venue, having hosted 25 finals.

References

External links
 NIFL official website
 Irish league Cup archive at the Irish Football Club Project
 Northern Ireland – List of League Cup Finals, RSSSF.com
Irish League Archive - League Cup

 
National association football league cups
3
Recurring sporting events established in 1987
1987 establishments in Northern Ireland